Dumblane is an historic house, located at 4120 Warren Street, Northwest, Washington, D.C. in the Tenleytown neighborhood.

History

The American Craftsman bungalow was built in 1911, by Mr. and Mrs. F. Hazen Bond.

It is listed on the National Register of Historic Places. The 2009 property value of Dumblane is $2,238,890.

See also
Dunblane manor (alternatively spelled Dumblane), a circa 1839 manor house built across the street, after which Dumblane was named

References

External links

Houses completed in 1911
Houses on the National Register of Historic Places in Washington, D.C.
American Craftsman architecture in Washington, D.C.